Hypena tenebralis is a moth in the family Erebidae first described by Frederic Moore in 1867. It is found in Taiwan.

References

Moths described in 1867
tenebralis